Samuel Edwin Merwin, Jr. (August 31, 1831 –  March 5, 1907), was an American politician who was the 64th Lieutenant Governor of Connecticut from 1889 to 1893.

Early life
Merwin was born in Brookfield, Connecticut on August 31, 1831, the son of Samuel Edwin Merwin Sr. and Ruby (née Nearing) Merwin.

Career
He received his early education in the district school and then from a private tutor. By the age of 16, he moved to New Haven. He served as a clerk in a store for three years, then went into business with his father. Later, he became president of the New Haven and Yale National Banks. He was a commanding officer of a company known as the "New Haven Grays" in the U.S. Army during the U.S. Civil War.

Political career
In 1872, Merwin became a member of the Connecticut State Senate for the 4th district, as the first Republican ever from that district He was a delegate to the Republican National Convention from Connecticut in 1884. He was elected Lieutenant Governor of Connecticut in November 1888, and served from January 10, 1889, while Morgan Bulkeley was the governor. In the election of 1890, Merwin defeated Bulkeley to the nomination for Republican candidate in the gubernatorial election. His opponent received a majority of less than 100 votes, and the election was contested.  There was a deadlock for two years, until the next election, in which Bulkeley still served as governor. Merwin continued serving as lieutenant governor during those years.

Merwin was the Republican candidate for governor in the election of 1892 as well, and aspired to become the candidate in 1894 too. However, in 1892, the gubernatorial election was won by Democrat Luzon Buritt Morris, and in 1894, Owen Vincent Coffin was the Republican candidate and won the election.

Personal life
Merwin died at his residence in New Haven, Connecticut on March 5, 1907, after an illness of three years.

References

External links

Military personnel from Connecticut
1831 births
1907 deaths
Lieutenant Governors of Connecticut
Connecticut Adjutant Generals
Connecticut state senators
People from Brookfield, Connecticut
19th-century American politicians